Momonga may refer to:
 Japanese dwarf flying squirrel (Pteromys momonga), one of two species of Old World flying squirrels in the genus Pteromys
 Momonga, a Tongva Native American settlement located in what is now Chatsworth, Los Angeles
 Ainz Ooal Gown, also known as Momonga, the protagonist of the light novel series Overlord

See also
Momonga Standing and Loop Coaster, a roller coaster at Yomiuriland, Tokyo